Eternity X was a progressive metal band from New Jersey, United States. The band was formed by vocalist Keith Sudano under the name of Eternity before changing its name to Eternity X due to legal reasons. They released four studio albums, From the Ashes, Zodiac, Mind Games and The Edge. Their last album From the Ashes was never released officially and only sold as a demo with a raw mix.
After the band disbanded, Keith Sudano attempted to reunite the band with a new lineup and intentions to release a new album but the plans never materialized. Sudano released his first solo album, The Biography of Me, in 2014.

References

American progressive metal musical groups
Musical groups established in 1985
Heavy metal musical groups from New Jersey
1985 establishments in New Jersey